Scott Munson (born 3 January 1970) is a Canadian former international soccer player, who participated at the 1991 CONCACAF Gold Cup. He played with the Kitchener Kickers and Vancouver 86ers.

References

External links

1970 births
Living people
Soccer players from Montreal
Canadian soccer players
Canada men's under-23 international soccer players
Canada men's international soccer players
1991 CONCACAF Gold Cup players
Vancouver Whitecaps (1986–2010) players
American Professional Soccer League players
Association football forwards
Kitchener Spirit players